Robert Archbald Watkins Jr. (born March 30, 1932) is a former American football halfback who played college football at Ohio State University and professionally in the National Football League (NFL).

Ohio State
Watkins was one of the first African American running backs at the Ohio State University.  He lettered from 1952 through 1954 and was one of the first recruits of legendary Ohio State football coach Woody Hayes.  Hayes shrugged off criticism by some bigoted alumni, insisting he would not consider recruits based on skin color.  Watkins was Ohio State's leading rusher in 1953 and leading scorer during the 1954 national championship season.

NFL
Watkins was the 23rd selection in the 1955 NFL Draft.  He played three years with the Bears before ending his career with the crosstown Chicago Cardinals.

Professional life
Watkins formerly served as a vice president of Seagrams and Sons and is an expert on the American Civil War.  He has been a guest speaker on many occasions including as the keynote speaker at the Plymouth Teaching American History Grant's culminating celebration.

He served as the Chair of  the University of Massachusetts Dartmouth Blue Ribbon Commission on Athletics.

External links
NFL.com player page

1932 births
Living people
American football halfbacks
Chicago Bears players
Chicago Cardinals players
Ohio State Buckeyes football players
Sportspeople from New Bedford, Massachusetts
Players of American football from Massachusetts
African-American players of American football
21st-century African-American people
20th-century African-American sportspeople